Mandahai (born 30 April 1622 – died 15 March 1652), was an imperial prince of the Qing dynasty and one of Nurhaci's grandson. He was the seventh son of Daišan and in 1649 he inherited his father's princedom. He was posthumously honoured as Prince Xunjian of the First Rank (巽簡親王) Prince Li (禮).

Life 
Mandahai was born in the Aisin Gioro clan on 30 April 1622 as the seventh son of Daišan.

His mother was Daišan's princess consort Lady Yehe Nara, who also bore the eighth son, Hūse.
He would join his father and uncles in military campaigns. He accompanied his father to the siege of Jinzhou in 1640. In the following year, he was given the title of bulwark duke.
 
He participated in the Battle of Shanhai Pass under Dorgon, which was a decisive battle leading to the beginning of Qing dynasty rule in China proper. Mandahai was promoted for his services to the rank of Prince of the Fourth Rank in 1644. In the next year, he joined his uncle, Ajige, in pursuit of the rebel leader Li Zicheng.

In 1649 he inherited his father's princedom. The peerage was renamed to Prince Xun of the First Rank. He was posthumously honoured as Prince Xun Jian of the First Rank (巽簡親王). His posthumous rank was demoted and name changed to a title of a beile.

After his death, Mandahai was accused of confiscating a part of Dorgon's property and was posthumously demoted. His son, Chang'adai, was demoted to a prince of the third degree but he was posthumously honoured as Prince Xun Huaimin of the First Rank (巽懷愍親王).

Family 
 Primary consort, of Khorchin Borjigit (嫡福晉 博爾濟吉特氏)
 Chang'adai, Prince Xunhuaimin of the First Rank (巽懷愍親王 常阿岱;(21 November 1643 - 29 May 1665), first son
 Primary consort, of Irgen Gioro clan (嫡福晉 伊爾根覺羅氏)
 Secondary consort, of Qite clan (側福晉 奇特氏)
 Mistress, of Šušu Gioro clan (舒舒覺羅氏)
 Lengsaiyi (楞塞宜), second son
 Mistress, of Wu clan (吳氏)

Ancestry

See also 
 Royal and noble ranks of the Qing dynasty#Male members
 Ranks of imperial consorts in China#Qing
 Prince Xun

References

Further reading 
 

Qing dynasty imperial princes

1622 births

1652 deaths